Lafangey Parindey is a 2010 Indian Hindi-language romantic drama film directed by Pradeep Sarkar, produced by Aditya Chopra and starring Neil Nitin Mukesh and Deepika Padukone in the lead roles. The film was released on 20 August 2010 under the Yash Raj Films banner. The story of the film is partially inspired from the 1978 American film, Ice Castles and the 1999 Tamil film, Thulladha Manamum Thullum.

Plot 

Pinky Palkar  is an aspiring skater who dreams of making it big through a television show. She is the archetypical Mumbai chawl girl who dreams big, despite her lowly surroundings. Her dreams goes away when One-Shot-Nandu, a fighter who pummels his opponents in the ring blindfolded, knocks her down in a freak car accident, making her blind. Despite her handicap, Pinky is determined to participate in the show. Full of remorse, Nandu trains her to "see" through her blindness, using her other senses. In return, she teaches him to skate and Nandu becomes her partner in the competition. They gradually fall in love.

Cast
 Neil Nitin Mukesh as Nandan 'One-Shot Nandu' Kamthekar
 Deepika Padukone as Pinky Palkar
 Kay Kay Menon as Anna (Special Appearance)
 Piyush Mishra as Usmaan Bhai
 Manish Choudhary as Inspector Keki Sethna
 Namit Das as Faizal Lateef Sheikh a.k.a. Chaddi
 Amey Pandya as Bablu Mane
 Rahul Pendkalkar as Pinky's younger brother
 Juhi Chawla in a Special Appearance
 Jaaved Jaaferi in a Special Appearance
 Shiamak Davar in a Special Appearance
 Pankaj Jha as the Eunuch
 S. M. Zaheer as a Commissioner
 Viraj Adhav as Diesel a.k.a. Rameshwar Iyer
 Vinay Sharma as Gulkand
 Palomi as Tina Mukherjee
 Atisha Naik

Production 
During the shooting of the film, Neil Nitin Mukesh admitted that the physical violence of the film is real. "I'm covered with welters, wounds and bruises", he explained.

Critical reception
Sukanya Verma of Rediff rated it 2.5/5 and said, "Ultimately Lafangey Parindey, like its attention-grabbing title, is unapologetically superficial with a brief attention span". Rajeev Masand of IBN rated it 2/5 "It's the kind of film that keeps you waiting for something to happen, but nothing ever does. You find yourself exhausted by the time the lights come back on". Mayank Shekhar of Hindustan Times rated it 1.5/5 "Scatter-brained, mish-mash of a movie". Noyon Jyoti Parasara of AOL rated the film 3 out of 5 saying, "Expect fun and you won't be disappointed, expect goosebumps and you may be!". Subhash K. Jha from IANS rated the film 3.5 out of 5 saying, "Movie is an inspirational tale told with as little fuss and as much feeling as cinematically possible. Not to be missed.".

Soundtrack

Track list
The album has six original tunes composed by R. Anandh, a famous ad jingle composer formerly part of the band Agosh who also did music for Sangeeth Sivan's films Zor and Nirnayam (Malayalam). Lyrics are by Swanand Kirkire.

References

External links 

 
 
 
 

2010 films
2010s Hindi-language films
Yash Raj Films films
Hindi remakes of Tamil films
Figure skating films
Indian sports drama films
Films about blind people in India
Indian romantic drama films
2010 romantic drama films
2010s sports drama films
Films directed by Pradeep Sarkar